Labor Standards Act is the English name given to legislation governing labour in the following countries:

Labor Standards Act (Japan), enacted in April 1947
Labor Standards Act (South Korea), enacted in 1953